Pseudochromis tapeinosoma, the blackmargin dottyback, is a species of ray-finned fish from the northwest Indo-Pacific Ocean around Australia, which is a member of the family Pseudochromidae.

References

tapeinosoma
Taxa named by Pieter Bleeker
Fish described in 1853